Pete, the Pedal Polisher is a 1915 American short comedy film featuring Harold Lloyd.

Cast
 Harold Lloyd

See also
 Harold Lloyd filmography

References

External links

1915 films
1915 comedy films
1915 short films
American silent short films
American black-and-white films
Films directed by Hal Roach
Silent American comedy films
American comedy short films
1910s American films